Artist 2.0 is the third studio album by American rapper A Boogie wit da Hoodie. It was released on February 14, 2020, by Highbridge and Atlantic Records. and contains features from Young Thug, Roddy Ricch, Gunna, London on da Track, DaBaby, Trap Manny, Summer Walker, Khalid, and Lil Uzi Vert. The deluxe edition of the album was released on June 19, 2020. It features an additional guest appearance from his firstborn daughter, Melody Valentine Dubose.

Background
A Boogie first announced the album in December 2018 with an original February 2019 release date before being pushed back. The day before release, A Boogie revealed the cover art and track listing for the album on his Instagram page, also revealing features from Young Thug, Roddy Ricch, Gunna, London on da Track, DaBaby, Trap Manny, Summer Walker, Khalid and Lil Uzi Vert.

Release and promotion

Singles
On September 13, 2019, A Boogie released a buzz single titled "Mood Swings". It debuted at number 76 on the Billboard Hot 100. It was followed by "Reply", featuring Lil Uzi Vert, on November 15. It debuted and peaked at number 49 on the Hot 100.

On January 31, 2020, he released "King of My City", debuting at number 69 on the Hot 100.

"Numbers" featuring Roddy Ricch, Gunna and London on da Track was sent to US rhythmic contemporary radio on March 31, 2020. The song debuted and peaked at number 23 on the Hot 100.

As part of the album's deluxe edition, "Bleed" was released as the official lead single, along with a video.

Teaser
On February 11, 2019, A Boogie released a teaser trailer on his YouTube channel.

Commercial performance
Artist 2.0 debuted at number two on the US Billboard 200 chart, earning 111,000 album-equivalent units (including 3,000 copies in pure album sales) in its first week. This became A Boogie's third US top-ten debut on the chart. The album also accumulated a total of 149 million in on-demand streams of songs from the album. In its second week, the album dropped to number six on the chart, earning an additional 57,000 units. On the chart dated July 4, 2020, the album returned to the top 10 (climbing from number 80 to number three) following the release of its deluxe version, selling 43,000 units. As of December 2020, the album has earned 774,000 album-equivalent units in the US. On July 30, 2021, the album was certified platinum by the Recording Industry Association of America (RIAA) for combined sales and album-equivalent units of over one million units in the United States.

Track listing

Charts

Weekly charts

Year-end charts

Certifications

References

2020 albums
A Boogie wit da Hoodie albums
Atlantic Records albums
Albums produced by London on da Track
Albums produced by Hitmaka
Albums produced by Boi-1da
Albums produced by Murda Beatz
Albums produced by Wheezy